Gustavo Kuerten was the defending champion but lost in the semifinals to Rainer Schüttler.

Sjeng Schalken won in the final 6–2, 6–4 against Rainer Schüttler.

Seeds

  Rainer Schüttler (final)
  Sjeng Schalken (champion)
  Gustavo Kuerten (semifinals)
  Fernando González (first round)
  Vince Spadea (quarterfinals)
  Juan Ignacio Chela (second round)
  Flávio Saretta (second round)
  Kenneth Carlsen (quarterfinals)

Draw

Finals

Top half

Bottom half

External links
 2003 Brasil Open Draw

Singles
Singles